Carex hirtigluma is a tussock-forming species of perennial sedge in the family Cyperaceae. It is native to central areas of Madagascar.

See also
List of Carex species

References

hirtigluma
Plants described in 1908
Taxa named by Charles Baron Clarke
Endemic flora of Madagascar